Ulava Charu is a South Indian soup dish from the state of Andhra Pradesh, India. It is popular in the Guntur and Krishna districts of Andhra Pradesh. It is made with Horse gram, a legume with the botanical name Macrotyloma uniflorum, called Ulava in the native Telugu. It is a local delicacy, as the preparation is labor-intensive. Packaged Ulava Chaaru is readily available in all urban and rural food supply stores in the state of Andhra Pradesh.

See also

 List of legume dishes

References

Andhra cuisine
Legume dishes
Indian soups and stews